The enzyme sulfopyruvate decarboxylase catalyzes the chemical reaction

3-sulfopyruvate  2-sulfoacetaldehyde + CO2

This enzyme belongs to the family of lyases, specifically the carboxy-lyases, which cleave carbon-carbon bonds.  The systematic name of this enzyme class is 3-sulfopyruvate carboxy-lyase (2-sulfoacetaldehyde-forming). This enzyme is also called sulfopyruvate carboxy-lyase.

References

 

EC 4.1.1
Enzymes of unknown structure